The Can de Palleiro is a traditional Spanish breed of shepherd dog from the autonomous community of Galicia in north-western Spain. It was recognised by royal decree in 2001, and the stud-book was established in the same year. It is named after the haystack near which it traditionally sleeps.

History 

The Can de Palleiro is a traditional shepherd dog breed from the autonomous community of Galicia. It was officially recognised by the Xunta de Galicia in April 2001, and a stud-book was established; it received national recognition by royal decree in May the same year. A breed association, the Club da Raza Can de Palleiro, was formed in 2002.

The breed had come close to extinction in the years before it was officially recognised. In 2009 its conservation status was reported as "in danger of extinction", but numbers were increasing. In 2022 it was listed by the Real Sociedad Canina de España among the breeds in the process of recovery.

References 

Livestock guardian dogs
Dog breeds originating in Galicia (Spain)